Le Péage-de-Roussillon (literally The Tollbooth of Roussillon) is a commune in the Isère department in southeastern France.

Le Péage-de-Roussillon has a train station on the line from Lyon to Valence. The town is currently considering a redevelopment of the train station, the aim being to revitalize the town centre and improve the links through the town. The initial work had been undertaken by a team consisting of the commune's planner and Grand Lyon which was also supplemented by JESH Planning based in the northwest of the UK.

Population

See also
Communes of the Isère department

References

Communes of Isère
Isère communes articles needing translation from French Wikipedia